Georgios Vakrakos (born 18 October 1997) is a Greek professional footballer who plays as a forward for Football League 2 club Ao Pyliou.

Career

Panetolikos
Vakrakos signed his first professional contract in July 2016.

He made his Superleague debut on 30 April 2017  in a match against Olympiacos.

References

External links
SuperLeague Profile

1997 births
Living people
Greek footballers
Association football forwards
Panetolikos F.C. players
Super League Greece players
Footballers from Agrinio